Hot Number is a studio album by the blues rock band The Fabulous Thunderbirds. It was released in 1987.

Track listing
All tracks composed by Kim Wilson; except where indicated
 "Stand Back"
 "Hot Number"
 "Wasted Tears"
 "It Comes to Me Naturally" (Al Anderson)
 "Love in Common"
 "How Do You Spell Love?" (Bobby Patterson, Jerry Strickland, Marshall Boxley)
 "Streets of Gold"
 "Sofa Circuit"
 "Don't Bother Trying to Steal Her Love"
 "It Takes a Big Man to Cry"

Personnel
The Fabulous Thunderbirds
Kim Wilson - vocals, harmonica
Jimmie Vaughan - guitar, bass, vocals
Preston Hubbard - electric and acoustic bass
Fran Christina - drums, vocals
with:
Dave Edmunds - guitar, vocals
Chuck Leavell - keyboards
Memphis Horns - horns

External links
Official Site

References

1987 albums
The Fabulous Thunderbirds albums
Albums produced by Dave Edmunds